Miacora leucocraspedontis is a moth in the family Cossidae. It was described by Zukowsky in 1954. It is found in Peru. The wingspan is about 25 mm. The forewings are bronzy-steel blue with a weak cream-coloured streak from the base of the costa to beyond the middle, broadening posteriorly, both before and beyond the fold. There is a creamy-white to fuscous postmedian streak, prolonged above the dorsum towards the tornus. The strongly dentate transverse line is edged with blue and there is a creamy-white spot in the middle of the discocellular, as well as a small one basal, reaching two-thirds across the wing. The hindwings are light tan, with a brown-grey submedian band reaching the termen, and415 with a bluey-white apical point.

References

Natural History Museum Lepidoptera generic names catalog

Cossinae
Moths described in 1954